Croteau is a francophone surname.

People with this name include:

 François Croteau (born 1972) Canadian politician
 Gary Croteau (born 1946), Canadian hockey player
 Julie Croteau (born 1970), first woman to play NCAA men's baseball, first woman to coach NCAA Division I men's baseball
 Marie-Danielle Croteau (born 1953) Canadian author
 Maxime Brinck-Croteau (born 1986) Canadian fencer
 Nathalie Croteau (1966–1989) victim of anti-women mass murder
 Nicole Croteau (born 1992) U.S. musician